James Strudwick Smith (September 8, 1787December 7, 1852) was a Congressional Representative from North Carolina; born near Hillsboro, North Carolina, September 8, 1787; attended a private school near Hillsboro and Hillsboro Academy; was graduated from Jefferson Medical College, Philadelphia, Pennsylvania, in 1818, and practiced medicine near Hillsboro and later near Chapel Hill, North Carolina; elected as a Democratic-Republican to the Fifteenth and Sixteenth Congresses (March 4, 1817 – March 3, 1821); chairman, Committee on Accounts (Sixteenth Congress); unsuccessful candidate for renomination; resumed the practice of medicine; member of the State house of commons in 1821 and 1822; delegate to the State constitutional convention in 1835; died near Chapel Hill, N.C., December 7, 1852; interment in a private cemetery on his farm.

See also 
Fifteenth United States Congress
Sixteenth United States Congress

External links 
Entry in US Congress Biographical Directory

References

Members of the North Carolina House of Representatives
Thomas Jefferson University alumni
1787 births
1852 deaths
Democratic-Republican Party members of the United States House of Representatives from North Carolina
19th-century American politicians
People from Hillsborough, North Carolina
Physicians from North Carolina
19th-century American physicians